Plemons-Stinnett-Phillips Consolidated Independent School District is a public school district based in Stinnett, Texas (USA).

It operates three schools, and it's mascot is the Comanche.

History
The consolidation of the Plemons, Stinnett, and phillips independent school districts into PSPCISD was effective July 1, 1987. Each of the predecessor school districts had its own mascot, and the "Comanches" was chosen as the mascot for the unified district.

Awards and recognition
 2016–2017 – Superior rating by FIRST
 FIRST – The state's school financial accountability rating system, known as the School Financial Integrity Rating System of Texas (FIRST), ensures that Texas public schools are held accountable for the quality of their financial management practices and that they improve those practices. The system is designed to encourage Texas public schools to better manage their financial resources to provide the maximum allocation possible for direct instructional purposes.
 2004 – National Blue Ribbon School
 2009 – "Recognized" by the Texas Education Agency

Schools
 West Texas High School (Grades 9-12)
 West Texas Middle School (Grades 6-8)
 West Texas Elementary School (Grades PK-5)

References

External links

Plemons-Stinnett-Phillips Consolidated ISD

School districts in Hutchinson County, Texas
1987 establishments in Texas
School districts established in 1987